Henry Cherry may refer to:

 Henry Hardin Cherry (1864–1937), leader in Kentucky higher education
 Henry C. Cherry, politician in North Carolina
 Henry P. Cherry (1823–1895), Michigan politician